Aglaoschema prasiniventre is a species of beetle in the family Cerambycidae. It was described by Gounelle in 1911.

References

Aglaoschema
Beetles described in 1911